Forever Abomination is the fourth studio album by American extreme metal band Skeletonwitch. It is also the first album to feature drummer Dustin Boltjes. The album was released on October 7, 2011.

Reception

Track listing

Release dates

Charts

Personnel
Skeletonwitch
 Chance Garnette - vocals
 Nate "N8 Feet Under" Garnette - guitars
 Scott "Scunty D." Hedrick - guitars
 Evan "Loosh" Linger - bass
 Dustin Boltjes - drums

References 

2011 albums
Skeletonwitch albums